Union County Schools is a school district headquartered in Union, South Carolina, United States. It serves Union County.

Schools
Buffalo Elementary School
Forest Park Elementary School
Jonesville Elementary/Middle School
Monarch Elementary School
Sims Middle School
Union County Career & Technology Center
Union County High School

References

External links

 Union County Schools

Education in Union County, South Carolina
School districts in South Carolina